Margaret Ann Bromhall (7 November 1890 – 5 January 1967) was an English radiotherapist. She was appointed to North Middlesex Hospital and was the first radiotherapist to lead a radiotherapy department.

Life
Born in Walsall, Staffordshire, Margaret Bromhall trained in medicine at Manchester University, qualifying M.B., Ch.B. in 1924, before working at the North of England Radium Institute in Newcastle upon Tyne. She travelled to Perth, Australia, where she worked as a radiotherapist for several years, and gained a diploma in medical radiology and electrotherapy in 1932. In 1934 she was appointed to head the newly established radiotherapy department at North Middlesex Hospital. She remained there until 1954.

She died in London in 1967. Papers relating to Margaret Bromhall are held at the University of Manchester Library.

References

Further reading
 J. F. H., 'Margaret A. Bromhall, M.B., Ch.B., D.M.R.E.', British Medical Journal, 28 January 1967.

1890 births
1967 deaths
British radiologists
20th-century English medical doctors
English women medical doctors
20th-century women physicians
Women radiologists
Alumni of the University of Manchester
20th-century English women
20th-century English people